Thomas Kim Hixson (born July 26, 1957) is an American educator and former politician.  He is the former dean of the College of Liberal Arts & Sciences at Frostburg State University.  He previously served four years as a member of the Wisconsin State Assembly, representing Whitewater and Rock County as a Democrat (2007–2011).

Biography

Hixson received an A.A. in Broadcasting at Chattanooga State Technical Community College, a B.A. in Advertising and English and a M.A. in Professional Writing from the University of Tennessee at Chattanooga, and a Ph.D. in Journalism from Southern Illinois University.

He is married, with a son and two daughters. Prior to his election to the Assembly, he was a professor of Advertising at the University of Wisconsin-Whitewater. He also served on the City of Whitewater Common Council and served as Council President.

In the Assembly, he chaired the Colleges and Universities Committee and was a member of the Education, Financial Institutions, Work Force Development, and Consumer Protection committees. He previously served as a member of the Committees on  Aging and Long Term Care, and Rural Economic Development.

In 2010, he lost his re-election bid to republican nominee Evan Wynn.

Hixson returned to the University of Wisconsin–Whitewater after his legislative service. He served as chairperson of the Communication Department before relocating to Utah State University to serve as Department Head of Journalism and Communication in July 2016.

He has appeared in several motion pictures, most recently Public Enemies and Mr. 3000.

References

External links
 Follow the Money - Kim Hixson
2008 2006 campaign contributions
Campaign 2008 campaign contributions at Wisconsin Democracy Campaign

Wisconsin city council members
People from Whitewater, Wisconsin
Politicians from Chattanooga, Tennessee
University of Tennessee at Chattanooga alumni
Southern Illinois University alumni
University of Wisconsin–Whitewater faculty
Male actors from Wisconsin
1957 births
Living people
21st-century American politicians
Democratic Party members of the Wisconsin State Assembly